Philodendron erubescens, the blushing philodendron or red-leaf philodendron, is a species of flowering plant in the family Araceae, native to Colombia. The specific epithet erubescens means "blushing".

Horticulture

It prefers indirect or filtered sunlight but will also tolerate lower light conditions. Similarly high humidity is ideal but it will manage with less.

More than a dozen hybrid cultivars of P. erubescens can commonly be found in cultivation, including: 
- 'Black Cardinal'
- 'Birkin' 
- 'Burgundy' 
- 'Green Emerald', 
- 'Green Princess', 
- 'Imperial Green', 
- 'Imperial Red',
- 'McColley’s Finale', 
- 'Moonlight', 
- 'Pink Princess', 
- 'Prince of Orange',
- 'Red Emerald', 
- 'Rojo Congo',
- 'White Princess'
- 'White Wizard'. 

Most of these cultivars are considered “self-heading”, and not climbing; in time, they form dense, compact colonies of individual plants, originating from a single larger stalk. The species, as well as some cultivars, have gained the Royal Horticultural Society's Award of Garden Merit.

All parts of P. erubescens are toxic and should be kept away from pets and young children. The leaves, stems, flowers, roots and petioles of all plants in the family Araceae contain varying amounts of calcium oxalate crystals (as do many thick-leaved, tropical plants). These compounds are not unique to aroids, as they are also found in some commonly consumed vegetables, like Swiss chard or spinach. For the unaware, the ingestion (or mere tasting) of any part of the plants can cause symptoms ranging from a few hours of oral tingling and esophageal irritation, to nausea, diarrhea, and vomiting; the rare, worst-case scenario would potentially see kidney stones developing in the patient (due to calcium oxalate buildup). Another aroid genera, 'Colocasia' (and sometimes 'Alocasia'), has a potato-like corm or bulb, which when boiled and mashed, is perfectly edible as a root vegetable. The leaves are also consumed in several countries in Asia, but careful attention is paid to their  steaming and cooking. Inadequate, rushed cooking time will not allow for complete breakdown of the cell walls; if eaten, undercooked leaves of 'Colocasia' can still cause oxalate irritation, itchiness or even pain in the esophagus, mouth, and digestive tract.

References

erubescens
Endemic flora of Colombia
House plants
Plants described in 1858
Vines